Messier Channel is a channel located in Patagonia, Chile. It trends north–south between Wellington Island and other Pacific islands and the continent, and is bounded on the north by the Gulf of Penas. Southward the name of this inside passage changes first to Angostura Inglesa (English Narrows) and then to Paso del Indio.

The channel is named after Charles Messier, who was a French astronomer. It is a fjord in the Scandinavian sense of the word. A depth of 1,358 m has been measured in the north part of this channel, making it one of the deepest fjords in the world. Messier Channel is surrounded by the Bernardo O'Higgins National Park and the Katalalixar National Reserve.

The Fallos-Ladrillero-Picton Channel combination is an optional route to the Messier-Grappler-Wide Channels route between the Golfo de Penas and the Trinidad Channel.

Just north of Angostura Inglesa (English Narrows), is the wreck of MV Capitán Leonidas, a small freighter that ran aground on the Bajo Cotopaxi (Cotopaxi Bank) in 1968. The hulk provides warning as both a shipwreck and lighthouse (NGA-nr: 2068, Adm.: G 1552).

See also
 List of islands of Chile
 List of fjords, channels, sounds and straits of Chile
 List of Antarctic and subantarctic islands
 List of lighthouses and lightvessels in Chile

References

Past Glaciations and "Little Ice Ages"
Multilingual substratum and superstratum in the toponymy of the south of Chile (Spanish)
Piret et al. (2017) - Gridded bathymetry of the Baker-Martinez fjord complex (Chile, 48°S) v1

Straits of Chile
Bodies of water of Aysén Region
Bodies of water of Magallanes Region